Sarangesa lunula is a species of butterfly in the family Hesperiidae. It is found in the Democratic Republic of the Congo.

References

Butterflies described in 1910
Celaenorrhinini
Endemic fauna of the Democratic Republic of the Congo